Resolution is the tenth studio album by southern rock band 38 Special, released in 1997. It was their first album since the 1991 album Bone Against Steel.

Long-time collaborator Jim Peterik co-wrote 10 of the album's 13 songs, and also gets his first performing credit with the band as a backing vocalist.

Track listing
"Fade to Blue" (Don Barnes, Danny Chauncey, Jim Peterik) – 4:33
"Just Can't Leave You Alone" (Barnes, Chauncey) – 4:24
"Déjà Voodoo" (Barnes, Jeff Carlisi, Peterik, Donnie Van Zant) – 5:56
"Find My Way Back" (Barnes, Chauncey, Peterik) – 4:57
"Changed by Love" (Chauncey, Peterik, D. Van Zant) – 4:53
"After the Fire Is Gone" (D. Van Zant, Johnny Van Zant) – 3:45
"Miracle Man" (Barnes, Carlisi, Chauncey, Peterik) – 4:05
"Shelter Me" (Barnes, Carlisi, Chauncey, Peterik) – 4:21
"Homeless Guitar" (Carlisi, Peterik, D. Van Zant) – 5:15
"Saving Grace" (Barnes, Chauncy, Peterik) – 4:10
"She Loves to Talk" (Barnes, Chauncey, D. Van Zant) – 3:37
"Trouble" (Chauncey, Peterik, D. Van Zant) – 5:16
"Shatter the Silence" (Barnes, Carlisi, Chauncey, Peterik) – 4:59

Personnel
Don Barnes – guitar, harmonica, mandolin, vocals, slide guitar
Danny Chauncey – guitar, keyboards, fretless bass
Larry Junstrom – bass guitar
Bobby Capps – keyboards, backing vocals
Greg Morrow – drums
Jim Peterik – backing vocals
Donnie Van Zant – vocals, acoustic guitar

Production
Producers: Don Barnes, Danny Chauncey, Joe Hardy
Mixing: Joe Hardy
Mastering: George Marino
Photography: Bill Bernstein

Charts
Singles – Billboard (United States)

References

38 Special (band) albums
1997 albums